EHC Team Wien is an ice hockey team in Vienna, Austria. They play in the Austrian National League, the second level of ice hockey in Austria. The club was founded in 2007, and started playing in the Nationalliga.

External links
 Official site

Ice hockey teams in Austria
Sport in Vienna
Ice hockey clubs established in 2007
2007 establishments in Austria
Austrian National League teams